Light Melody (Finnish: Kirkastuva sävel) is a 1946 Finnish musical film directed by Edvin Laine and starring Kalle Ruusunen, Veli-Matti Kaitala and Ruth Luoma-Aho.

Partial cast
 Kalle Ruusunen as Eero Merjanen  
 Veli-Matti Kaitala as Martti Merjanen  
 Ruth Luoma-Aho as Marja Blomqvist  
 Rauha Rentola as Vappu  
 Doris Hovimaa as Carmen  
 Aku Korhonen as Peter Blomqvist  
 Uuno Laakso as Vippi-Julle  
 Jalmari Rinne as Opera manager  
 Heikki Aaltoila as Conductor  
 Litja Ilmari as Stina Malm  
 Kalle Viherpuu as Peltonen 
 Matti Aulos as Heikkinen  
 Pirkko Raitio as Mrs. Häkkinen  
 Kaisu Leppänen as Raili Salmio  
 Gunnar Calenius as Heinämaa  
 Ossi Korhonen as Pawnbroker  
 Joel Asikainen as Singer in restaurant  
 Pentti Viljanen as Auctioneer  
 Vili Järe as Stage manager  
 Vilho Jauhiainen 
 Tarmo Manni as Raili's companion

References

Bibliography 
 Tad Bentley Hammer. International film prizes: an encyclopedia. Garland, 1991.

External links 
 

1946 films
1946 musical films
Finnish musical films
1940s Finnish-language films
Films directed by Edvin Laine
Finnish black-and-white films